Death Wish Live was a week of live shows from Channel 4 showcasing stunts for entertainment.  The five nights each featured a particular artiste; Jonathan Goodwin, The Pain Men, Zamora The Torture King, Pyro Boy & The Cirque de Flambe.

Jonathan Goodwin opened the series with a hangman stunt where he was to escape cuffs before a water filled barrel pulled the noose upwards, lifting him smoothly off his feet rather than the traditional trapdoor method, in a stunt called Cheating the Gallows. The stunt went wrong when he failed to pick the lock and was seen kicking his legs before passing out and being dropped, unconscious, into cardboard boxes at which point the show went to intermission. Producers later explained that the stunt had pre-arranged safety measures, meaning Goodwin's life was never in danger.

References

External links
 

British reality television series
Television series produced at Pinewood Studios